The  is the top singles title in the Japanese professional wrestling promotion Osaka Pro Wrestling. The title was established in 2000 when Super Delfin defeated Dick Togo to be crowned the inaugural champion.

, there have been a total of 20 recognized champions, who have had a combined 34 official reigns and there have been three vacancies.

Title history

Names 

On January 18, 2019, the title was renamed .

During the COVID-19 pandemic in Japan, OPW remained fairly inactive, having held only one event in 2020 and one in 2021. In July 30, 2021, Zeus was appointed as the owner and president of OPW. On August 26, he received a share transfer from former owner Yuji Sakagami. Following the acquisition, OPW underwent a "relaunch" in early 2022. On May 1, a new belt was unveiled and Zeus defeated Kazuaki Mihara to win the title, which was now once again referred to as the Osaka Pro Wrestling Championship.

Reigns

Combined reigns

See also
Osaka Pro Wrestling Battle Royal Championship
Osaka Pro Wrestling Tag Team Championship

References

External links
http://osaka.puroresufan.com/?page_id=644
Championship

Championship
Regional professional wrestling championships
Openweight wrestling championships